Dyjákovičky is a municipality and village in Znojmo District in the South Moravian Region of the Czech Republic. It has about 600 inhabitants.

Notable people
Ferdinand Kauer (1751–1831), Austrian composer and pianist

References

Villages in Znojmo District